Faith Murray (born 1951) is an English female former track cyclist.

Cycling career
Murray was a revolutionary women's cyclist winning the first six British National Individual Sprint Championships open to women, from 1972 until 1977. She represented Great Britain at the 1976 UCI Road World Championships.

References

1951 births
British female cyclists
British track cyclists
Living people